This is a list of members of the South Australian Legislative Council between 1979 and 1982. As half of the Legislative Council's terms expired at each state election, half of these members were elected at the 1975 state election with terms expiring in 1982, while the other half were elected at the 1979 state election with terms expiring in 1985.

 Labor MLC Jim Dunford died on 12 May 1982. Mario Feleppa was appointed to the resulting casual vacancy on 1 June.
 Norm Foster was elected as a representative of the Labor Party, but left the party in June 1982 in order to cross the floor and support the construction of the Olympic Dam. He served out the remainder of his term as an independent.

References

 "Statistical Record of the Legislature, 1837–2007", Parliament of South Australia, 2007.
 "History of South Australian Elections, 1857–2006", Dean Jaensch, 2006.

Members of South Australian parliaments by term
20th-century Australian politicians